Great Transport is a 1983 Yugoslav action–drama war film directed by Veljko Bulajić. The film was selected as the Yugoslav entry for the Best Foreign Language Film at the 56th Academy Awards, but was not accepted as a nominee. Great Transport stars James Franciscus, Steve Railsback, Robert Vaughn, Helmut Berger, and Edward Albert.

Plot
In May 1943, Yugoslav Partisans' HQ in Vojvodina decides to send reinforcements to beleaguered Partisan units in eastern Bosnia. A convoy of more than a thousand volunteers carrying food, clothes and medicine, led by Pavle Paroški, embarks on a dangerous mission. They are joined by Paroški's girlfriend Dunja, doctor Emil Kovač, and British major Mason and his radio operator Danny, who are tasked with establishing the communications with the Partisans.

Cast
 James Franciscus as John Mason
 Steve Railsback as Pavle Paroški (voiced by Marko Nikolić)
 Robert Vaughn as Dr. Emil Kovač
 Helmut Berger as Colonel Glassendorf
 Edward Albert as Danny  
 Joseph Campanella as German Major (voiced by Peter Carsten)
 Bata Zivojinovic as Kosta
 Dragana Varagić as Dunja
 Zvonko Lepetić as Baća
 Ljiljana Blagojević as Dragana
 Tihomir Arsić as Jocika
 Dragomir Felba as Tima
 Dragan Bjelogrlić as Bora
 Dušan Janićijević as Commander Miloš

Release and reception
Great Transport was released in Yugoslavian theatres on 5 July 1983. The film was released on DVD.

Bulajić's attempt of emulating the epic scope of Battle of Neretva (1969) did not find success with the critics, and was ignored by the audiences, who saw it as an anachronism, particularly in the times of economic adversity in Yugoslavia in the 1980s. Its failure marked the end of an era of epic Yugoslav partisan films.

See also
 List of submissions to the 56th Academy Awards for Best Foreign Language Film
 List of Yugoslav submissions for the Academy Award for Best Foreign Language Film

References

Sources

External links
 

1983 films
1980s war drama films
Serbo-Croatian-language films
Films directed by Veljko Bulajić
Yugoslav war drama films
Films set in 1943
1983 drama films
Films set in Yugoslavia
War films set in Partisan Yugoslavia
Films set in Vojvodina
Yugoslav World War II films